The Boy Who Cried Werewolf may refer to:

 The Boy Who Cried Werewolf (1973 film), a 1973 film directed by Nathan H. Juran
 The Boy Who Cried Werewolf (2010 film), a 2010 Nickelodeon telemovie
'The Boy Who Cried Werewolf', Season 1 Episode 8 Malcolm & Eddie (1996 TV Series)
'The Boy Who Cried Werewolf', Movie Macabre (1981 TV Series)
'The Boy Who Cried Werewolf', Season 1 Episode 3 Werewolf (TV series) 1987
'The Boy Who Cried Werewolf', Season 3 Episode 5 Svengoolie (1995 TV Series)

See also
The Boy Who Cried Wolf
Cry Wolf (disambiguation)